Walliebum is a rural locality in the Fraser Coast Region, Queensland, Australia.

Road infrastructure
Maryborough–Hervey Bay Road (State Route 57) runs through from south-east to north-east.

References 

Fraser Coast Region
Localities in Queensland